Air Andalucia was a low-cost airline based in Granada, Spain. It was a start-up airline intending to operate domestic services, as well as services to Europe. Its main base was Federico García Lorca Airport, Granada.

Air Andalucia went bankrupt in 2005.

History 

The airline was established in 2003 and was due to start operations in March 2005 but never launched flights. It was owned by AJet (Aviation Holdings) Ltd.

It was the first airline at Granada airport offering direct flights to international destinations at a low cost. The airline would use Airbus 320 aircraft and expected to expand its fleet to 18 aircraft.

Destinations

International services were to be operated from Granada to London and Odense, Denmark.

See also
List of defunct airlines of Spain

References

Defunct airlines of Spain
Airlines established in 2003
Airlines disestablished in 2005
2003 establishments in Spain